Kunzea leptospermoides, commonly known as Yarra burgan, is a flowering plant in Myrtaceae, the myrtle family, and is endemic to Victoria, Australia. It is an erect shrub or small tree with narrow leaves and white flowers crowded near the ends of the branches in spring.

Description

Taxonomy and naming
Kunzea leptospermoides was first formally described in 1856 by Friedrich Miquel following an unpublished description by Ferdinand von Mueller. The description was published in Nederlandsch Kruidkundig Archief. The specific epithet (leptospermoides) refers to the similarity of this species to a Leptospermum. The ending -oides is a Latin suffix meaning "resembling" or "having the form of".

This kunzea was formerly included in Kunzea ericoides but that species is now regarded as a New Zealand endemic.

Distribution and habitat
Yarra burgan grows near watercourses and in damp forest in the Yarra Valley.

Uses
Kunzea peduncularis is suitable for use as a screening plant. It grows best in full sun in well-drained soils. It attracts butterflies and provides nesting sites for small birds.

The wood was important to the Kulin people for making fighting implements and boomerangs.

References

leptospermoides
Flora of Victoria
Myrtales of Australia
Plants described in 1856